Alla Georgievna Danko (born March 15, 1946, Moscow) is an announcer Soviet Central Television, the TV presenter, journalist.

Biography 
Her father worked in television, his mother - a linguist.

Graduated I.M. Sechenov First Moscow State Medical University, then - clinical residency on  "occupational diseases of the nervous system"; worked as a junior researcher.

Since 1975, successfully passed a competition for the position of speaker, began to work on the Central Television in the TV company  Ostankino: led information, music, sports programs (Morning, Vremya, Moscow News, Good Evening, Moscow, Mom's School, What Are Your Names, and others).

Since 1995 to 2000 - chief editor, assistant producer music service Channel One Russia.

Subsequently, she worked on the channels of TV Center, REN TV, REN TV.

Currently, the general director of  Dankoproduction.  She teaches at the Higher National School of television.

Awards
 Honoured Artist of Russia
 Medal "In Commemoration of the 850th Anniversary of Moscow" (1997)

References

External links 
 Международная академия телевидения и радио

1946 births
Living people
Mass media people from Moscow
Soviet television presenters
Russian television presenters
Russian women television presenters
Russian television journalists
Russian women journalists
Honored Artists of the Russian Federation
Radio and television announcers
Russian radio presenters
Russian women radio presenters